in located in the town of  Komono,  Mie Prefecture, Japan, operated by the private railway operator Kintetsu Railway.

Lines
Ōbane Station is a station on the Yunoyama Line, and is located 13.5 rail kilometers from the  opposing terminus of the line at Kintetsu-Yokkaichi Station.

Station layout
The station consists of a side platform with a bi-directional track.  There is no station building or ticket machines. The station is unattended

Platforms

Adjacent stations

History
March 23, 1964 - Mie Electric Railway opens the station.
April 1, 1965 - Due to mergers, stations fall under the ownership of Kintetsu.
April 1, 2007 - Support for PiTaPa and ICOCA begins.

Passenger statistics
In fiscal 2019, the station was used by an average of 481 passengers daily (boarding passengers only).

Surrounding area
Japan National Route 477

See also
List of railway stations in Japan

References

External links

 Kintetsu: Ōbaneen Station 

Railway stations in Japan opened in 1964
Railway stations in Mie Prefecture
Komono